Thandaung Gyi (Phlone ;) is a town in Kayin State, Myanmar. It is the capital of Thandaunggyi Township.

References

External links
 Satellite map at Maplandia.com

Township capitals of Myanmar
Populated places in Kayin State